Villingili Youth and Sports Association (VYANSA) is a Maldivian sports club best known for its football team. The club is based in Villingili, currently playing in the top division.

External links
Official Website
Dhivehi League Standings

Footnotes

Football clubs in the Maldives
2002 establishments in the Maldives